Heide Seyerling (born 19 August 1976) is a former South African athlete, born in Port Elizabeth, specializing in the 200 and 400 metres. She twice competed at the Olympic Games, in 2000 and 2004. At the 2000 Games she reached the 400 metres final finishing 6th with a new (and still standing now) national record of 50.05. She is married to former sprinter Mathew Quinn.

Competition record

Personal bests
100 m – 11.35 (-0.3) (Durban 1999)
200 m – 22.63 (+1.8) (Durban 2001)
400 m – 50.05 (Sydney 2000)

References

External links
 IAAF profile

1976 births
Living people
Sportspeople from Port Elizabeth
South African female sprinters
Athletes (track and field) at the 2000 Summer Olympics
Athletes (track and field) at the 2004 Summer Olympics
Olympic athletes of South Africa
Athletes (track and field) at the 1998 Commonwealth Games
Athletes (track and field) at the 2002 Commonwealth Games
Commonwealth Games competitors for South Africa
African Games silver medalists for South Africa
African Games medalists in athletics (track and field)
Athletes (track and field) at the 1999 All-Africa Games
Athletes (track and field) at the 2003 All-Africa Games
Olympic female sprinters